The Red Lion Inn is a Grade II* listed pub, built in the late 15th/early 16th century, at 55 High Street, Southampton, Hampshire SO14 2NS. It is on the Campaign for Real Ale's National Inventory of Historic Pub Interiors.

The half-timbered room known as the court room was the site of the trial of the conspirators in the Southampton Plot. This appears to be a local legend. The trial took place in 1415, about 75 years before the foundation of this building, and there is no documentary evidence from 1415 that would locate it here. In any case, the plotters were imprisoned in the castle and it is unlikely that they were moved down the High Street for a trial in an inn when the castle afforded ample facilities. A mournful procession of ghosts reportedly sighted leaving from the inn has been linked to the plotters.

It has been claimed that the inn itself is haunted by a barmaid, described as being in her sixties and only visible above the knees, who reportedly drifts through the bar area.

During his exile after 1852, Juan Manuel de Rosas, the former governor of Buenos Aires, used to frequent the place.

References

Grade II* listed pubs in Hampshire
National Inventory Pubs
Pubs in Southampton
Reportedly haunted locations in South East England
Timber framed buildings in Hampshire